Les Premiers-Sapins (literally The First Firs) is a commune in the Doubs department in the Bourgogne-Franche-Comté region in eastern France. Nods is the municipal seat.

History 
On 1 January 2016, Les Premiers-Sapins was created by the merger of Athose, Chasnans, Hautepierre-le-Châtelet, Nods, Rantechaux and Vanclans.

References

Premiers-Sapins